Xenobrochus is a genus of brachiopods belonging to the family Dyscoliidae.

The species of this genus are found in Southern Africa.

Species:

Xenobrochus africanus 
Xenobrochus agulhasensis 
Xenobrochus australis 
Xenobrochus indianensis 
Xenobrochus naudei 
Xenobrochus norfolkensis 
Xenobrochus rotundus 
Xenobrochus translucidus

References

Brachiopod genera
Terebratulida